Jacksboro is a city in Jack County, Texas, in the United States. Its population was 4,511 at the 2010 census. U.S. Highways 281 and 380, and Texas State Highways 114 and 199 intersect at Jacksboro, which is the county seat of Jack County.

History
Jacksboro was first settled in the 1850s, with newcomers attracted by land offers from the Texas Emigration and Land Office. Originally called "Mesquiteville", the community grew up along the banks of Lost Creek and spread out over the pastureland between Lost Creek and the waters of the West Fork of Keechi Creek. It was renamed "Jacksboro" in 1858, when it became the county seat, in honor of brothers William and Patrick Jack, veterans of the Texas Revolution. Regular postal service began in 1859.  Jacksboro was located on one route of the Butterfield Overland Mail.

The county was one of the few in Texas to vote against secession before the Civil War. It continued to suffer from Native American raids until Fort Richardson was built and garrisoned in 1870 south of Jacksboro. The town gained national attention in 1871 when two Kiowa chiefs, Satanta and Big Tree, were tried for murder there.

The arrival of the Chicago, Rock Island & Texas Railroad in 1898 increased the town's commercial importance to the surrounding region, enhancing it as a center of trade. The completion of highways and other roads later on also connected the town to other markets.

Fort Richardson State Historical Park is in the southern part of the city. Jacksboro claims to have the first state 4-H club, formed in the 1910s.

On March 21, 2022, an EF3 tornado struck the town causing damage to around 80 homes and heavily damaging the high school. Nine people were injured.

Geography

Jacksboro is located in central Jack County at  (33.223355, –98.160845). U.S. Route 281 runs through the city center, leading south  to Mineral Wells and northwest  to Wichita Falls. U.S. Route 380 joins US 281 in the center of Jacksboro, but heads west out of town on Belknap Street, leading  to Graham. US 380 leaves Jacksboro to the southeast with US 281, but then leads east  to Decatur.

The water area comprises Lake Jacksboro, a reservoir on Lost Creek in the northeast part of the city. Jacksboro is part of the watershed of the West Fork of the Trinity River.

Climate

The climate in this area is characterized by hot, humid summers and generally mild to cool winters.  According to the Köppen climate classification, Jacksboro has a humid subtropical climate, Cfa on climate maps.

Demographics

2020 census

As of the 2020 United States census, there were 4,184 people, 1,468 households, and 861 families residing in the city.

2000 census
At the census of 2000,  4,533 people, 1,382 households, and 954 families resided in the city. The population density was 778.7 people per square mile (300.7/km2). The 1,559 housing units average 267.8/sq mi (103.4/km2). The racial makeup of the city was 81.95% White, 10.46% African American, 0.57% Native American, 0.31% Asian, 0.02% Pacific Islander, 5.56% from other races, and 1.13% from two or more races. Hispanics or Latinos of any race were 10.74% of the population.

Of the 1,382 households, 33.7% had children under the age of 18 living with them, 53.7% were married couples living together, 11.7% had a female householder with no husband present, and 30.9% were not families. About 28.4% of households were one person and 16.3% were one person aged 65 or older. The average household size was 2.50, and the average family size was 3.06.
The age distribution was 21.7% under  18, 13.0% from 18 to 24, 33.1% from 25 to 44, 17.9% from 45 to 64, and 14.3% were 65 or older. The median age was 35 years. For every 100 females, there were 139.0 males. For every 100 females age 18 and over, there were 156.5 males.

The median household income was $30,833, and the median family income  was $36,759. Males had a median income of $26,716 versus $20,592 for females. The per capita income for the city was $13,595. About 12.2% of families and 15.0% of the population were below the poverty line, including 16.0% of those under age 18 and 14.4% of those age 65 or over.

Education
The city is served by the Jacksboro Independent School District.

Notable people
 Darrell Lester, former All-American football player at Texas Christian University
 Abe Martin, former head coach and athletic director at Texas Christian University
 Don Massengale, former professional golfer on the PGA Tour
 Rik Massengale, former professional golfer on the PGA Tour
 David Spiller, Texan legislator on the 68th district.

Gallery

References

External links
 City of Jacksboro official website
 Handbook of Texas Online: Jacksboro, Texas
 Jacksboro Chamber of Commerce

Cities in Texas
Cities in Jack County, Texas
County seats in Texas
Butterfield Overland Mail in Texas
Stagecoach stops in the United States